Bernice Jan Liu (born January 6, 1979) is a Canadian actress, singer, and commercial model based in Hong Kong. She has previously held the title Miss Chinese Vancouver 2000 as well as Miss Chinese International 2001, the latter position bringing her fame in Hong Kong. Liu left Television Broadcasts Limited (TVB) in 2011 and returned to Canada to continue her education. As of 2016, she has continued her acting for new broadcaster ViuTV.

Liu was best known for her role as Princess Sam-tin in the long-running TVB sitcom, Virtues of Harmony, which was also her first role after joining TVB in 2001. Liu's singing breakthrough came to an attention in 2005 after she lent her voice for the theme song of the 2005 TVB serial drama, Into Thin Air, which she also stars in. The theme song, "Truth," was Liu's first theme song and was one of the primary promotional songs for the TVB compilation album, Lady in Red (2006), which sold past 10,000 copies in the first day of release. Liu was also listed by critics as one of the few TVB artists to look forward to in a future singing career.

Early life and education
Liu was born in Prince Rupert, British Columbia on January 6, 1979.

Liu has a brother and a sister.

Liu attended the University of British Columbia for three years as a pre-med student in the Faculty of Science before transferring to UBC Sauder School of Business to pursue a Bachelor of Commerce. While in university, she worked at a Chinese language television station in Vancouver to learn conversational Cantonese. The television executives encouraged her to participate in beauty pageants, which led her to win both Miss Chinese Vancouver 2000 and Miss Chinese International 2001. Her victories caught the attention of talent scouts at TVB, who offered her an acting contract in March 2001. Liu accepted the offer and put her studies on hold to pursue an entertainment career. She originally struggled with reading the scripts as they were written in Chinese and received help from her family. She later re-enrolled at UBC Sauder in May 2018 and graduated spring 2020.

Career

In 2002, after a successful reception of Virtues of Harmony, TVB decided to produce a modern spin-off for the sitcom, which she played a different character.

In early 2011, after filming Show Me the Happy and Home Troopers with TVB, Liu left the station. She later starred in several Chinese dramas between 2011 and 2016 and continues to star in dramas for ViuTV.

Liu is the CEO and director of Bellavizio, a wine company she founded in 2008. They produce wine out of Bordeaux, France, and Napa, California.

Liu is the owner of WineMaven, an online community for wine enthusiasts.

Liu was awarded the Queen Elizabeth II Diamond Jubilee Medal in 2012.

Personal life 
Liu is a Christian. She was previously linked to actors Hawick Lau and Moses Chan. She married French boyfriend Emmanuel John in 2008. They announced in 2012 that they had separated in 2009 and were later divorced.

Filmography

Film

Television

References

External links 

 

Bernice Liu's profile on TVB
Official Bernice Liu YouTube Channel
Photo of Bernie Liu as Vice in King of Fighters
Interview with Bernice Liu from King of Fighters

|-
! colspan="3" style="background: #DAA520;" | Miss Chinese Vancouver
|-

|-
! colspan="3" style="background: #DAA520;" | Miss Chinese International
|-

1979 births
21st-century Canadian actresses
Actresses from Vancouver
Canadian actresses of Hong Kong descent
Canadian expatriates in Hong Kong
Female models from British Columbia
Canadian film actresses
Canadian television actresses
Living people
Miss Chinese International winners
Musicians from Vancouver
People from Prince Rupert, British Columbia
UBC Sauder School of Business alumni
21st-century Canadian women singers
Canadian-born Hong Kong artists